Throwing Muses is an American musical group.

Throwing Muses may also refer to:

Throwing Muses (1986 album)
Throwing Muses (2003 album)